O Canada is the national anthem of Canada.

O Canada may also refer to:

 O Canada! (film), a film at the Canada pavilion of Epcot
 O Canada (TV series), an animated anthology series
 "Oh Canada" (Missy Higgins song) (2016)
 "O Canada! mon pays, mes amours", a patriotic song of 19th century
 O Canada (book), a 1965 history book by Edmund Wilson
 "Oh, Canada", a song by Five Iron Frenzy from the album Our Newest Album Ever! (1997)
 O Canada, Name of a Round the World Sailing Yacht